Montclair State University (MSU) is a public research university in Montclair, New Jersey, with parts of the campus extending into Little Falls. As of fall 2018, Montclair State was, by enrollment, the second largest public university in New Jersey. As of November 2021, there were 21,005 total enrolled students: 16,374 undergraduate students and 4,631 graduate students. It is classified among "R2: Doctoral Universities – High research activity". The university offers more than 300 majors, minors, and concentrations.

History
Plans for the State Normal school were initiated in 1903, and required a year for the State of New Jersey to grant permission to build the school. It was then established as New Jersey State Normal School at Montclair, a normal school, in 1908 approximately 5 years after the initial planning of the school. At the time, Governor John Franklin Fort attended the dedication of the school in 1908, and the school was to have its first principal Charles Sumner Chapin that same year. The first building constructed was College Hall, and it still stands today. The first graduating class, which numbered at 45 students, contained William O. Trapp, who would then go on to win the Pulitzer Prize for journalism in 1929. The first dormitory was then built five years later, in 1915, and is known as Russ Hall.

In 1924, Dr. Harry Sprague was the first president of Montclair, and shortly afterwards the school began being more inclusive of extracurricular activities such as athletics. In 1927, however, after studies had emerged concerning the number of high school teachers in the state of New Jersey (only 10% of all high school teachers received their degrees from New Jersey), the institution became Montclair State Teachers College and developed a four-year (Bachelor of Arts) program in pedagogy, becoming the first US institute to do so. In 1937 it became the first teachers college accredited by the Middle States Association of Colleges and Schools.

In 1943, during World War II, several students, with permission from the president, Harry Sprague, joined the US Navy as volunteers to train for the war. It was also a time when students and faculty sold war bonds to support US American troops.

In 1958 the school merged with the Panzer College of Physical Education and Hygiene to become Montclair State College. The school became a comprehensive multi-purpose institution in 1966. The Board of Higher Education designated the school a teaching university on April 27, 1994, and in the same year the school became Montclair State University. It has offered Master of Arts programs since 1932, Master of Business Administration since 1981, Master of Education since 1985, Master of Science since 1992, Master of Fine Arts since 1998, Doctor of Education since 1999, and Doctor of Environmental Management in 2003 (now the PhD in Environmental Science and Management). PhD degrees were added in Teacher Education and Teacher Development in 2008, Counselor Education, Family Studies, Mathematics Education, Communications Sciences and Disorders by 2014, and most recently Clinical as well as Industrial/Organizational Psychology (2021). In 2018, Montclair State University graduated more than 30 doctoral students.

In 2004, NJ Transit opened the Montclair State University station, which links the university to New York City. The building of the MSU Station cost $26 million to complete, including a 1,500-space parking deck. In 2015, the university established the School of Communication and Media and added two new buildings to its campus; the Feliciano School of Business and the Center for Environmental and Life Sciences (CELS). Partridge Hall was fully renovated and in 2016, became the new School of Nursing, which welcomed its inaugural class of students that fall. In 2016, Montclair State University was designated by the U.S. Department of Education as a Hispanic-Serving Institution (HSI). In 2017, Montclair State was designated a public research university by the New Jersey Legislature. The new state-of-the-art home for the School of Communication and Media opened in fall 2017, followed in 2018 by the opening of the Center for Computing and Information Science in the former Mallory Hall, which underwent a complete renovation and expansion. In 2016, the university's classification was changed from a Masters to a Doctoral Research University, and in 2019, was changed to R2: Doctoral University - High Research Activity.

Presidents

Colleges and Schools
Montclair State University comprises five colleges and six schools, each led by a Dean or Director. The colleges and schools organize and conduct academic programs within their units (Bachelor's, Master's, Doctoral and Certificate Programs), and work cooperatively to offer interdisciplinary programs.

College of the Arts

John J. Cali School of Music 
The John J. Cali School of Music is part of the College of the Arts. The Cali School of Music provides a wide range of study and performance opportunities for its undergraduate and graduate students, as well as a professional certification program in Music Education and the Artist's Diploma and Performer's Certificate degrees in classical and jazz performance. The noted string quartet, the Shanghai Quartet, was in residence at MSU from 2002-2020. As part of their new residency programs, the Cali School welcomed the Harlem Quartet as its new quartet-in-residence and introduced Jessie Montgomery as its composer-in-residence. In 2021, the Cali School implemented the Cali Pathways Project, a scholarship program designed to create dynamic and comprehensive pathways to higher education and careers in music for talented student musicians from underrepresented backgrounds.

School of Communication and Media 
Included in the College of the Arts is the School of Communication and Media.

The school opened a well-equipped, modern facility in fall 2017. It features a 187-seat Sony Digital Cinema Presentation Hall, four broadcast-ready HD + 4K studio and control rooms, motion picture stage for digital filmmaking, and an Audio Production Center featuring a Foley stage, a performance stage and audio sound labs.

College of Education and Human Services
The College of Education and Human Services houses the Center of Pedagogy, with oversees the Teacher Education program. Majors across the university earning teacher credentials are administered jointly by the Center of Pedagogy and the department that houses the student's major.

College of Humanities and Social Sciences
The College of Humanities and Social Sciences at Montclair State offers 20 undergraduate majors and more than 40 minors. The College of Humanities and Social Sciences is the largest college by enrollment within Montclair State.

Montclair State supports and encourages interdisciplinary programs. In 2019, the College of Humanities and Social Sciences and the College of Science and Mathematics have teamed up to offer the ONLY Master of Science in Computational Linguistics program in New Jersey https://www.montclair.edu/graduate/programs-of-study/computational-linguistics-ms/.

College of Science and Mathematics
The College of Science and Mathematics (CSAM) offers programs in the natural, physical, life, and computational sciences. Located in Richardson Hall are the Department of Physics and Astronomy, Department of Chemistry and Biochemistry, and the Student Success Center. Science Hall houses the Department of Biology. The Department of Computer Science and the Department of Mathematics are housed in the Center for Computing and Information Science.

The Center for Environmental and Life Sciences (CELS) houses the Department of Earth and Environmental Studies, which includes Earth and Environmental Science, Geographic and Urban Studies, and Sustainability Science. CELS houses the PSEG Institute for Sustainability Studies, New Jersey Center for Water Science and Technology, Clean Energy and Sustainability Analytics Center, Microscopy and Microanalysis Research Lab, Sokol Institute for Pharmaceutical and Life Sciences, and the interdisciplinary PhD Program in Environmental Science and Management.

Feliciano School of Business 
The Feliciano School of Business offers undergraduate as well as MBA programs. Students may opt to choose the Bachelor of Arts approach or the Bachelor of Science. The school offers a BA degree program culminating in a Bachelor of Arts in Economics. In 2016, the MBA program became available in a fully online format. The School of Business also offers post-MBA certificate programs. In 2015 a brand new building for the Feliciano School of Business opened, dedicated to Mimi and Edwin Feliciano.

School of Nursing 
In 2016, Montclair State University launched a School of Nursing. It offers RN-to-BSN and four-year BSN programs. The school is housed in a state-of-the-art facility that includes mediated classrooms, computer study areas, a nursing skills laboratory, anatomy laboratory, and high-fidelity and home care simulation rooms.

The Graduate School
Montclair State began offering master's degree programs in 1932, beginning with the Master of Fine Arts degree; the university began to grant doctoral degrees in 1998, after receiving state approval to establish a Doctor of Education degree in pedagogy. In the fall of 2019, the university had about 300 doctoral students in eight programs.

University College
University College is an academic home for students to pursue interests that will lead them to their eventual academic concentration. University College admits about one-third of incoming freshman, as well as approximately 1,400 returning and transfer students who have yet to declare a major. Once University College students have been admitted to their chosen majors, they will transition onto the college or school of that academic program.

Rankings

U.S. News & World Report listed Montclair State as No. 179 among all national universities in its 2022 rankings, No. 19 in Top Performers on Social Mobility and No. 88 in Top Public Schools. U.S. News & World Report 2022 Best Graduate Schools ranked several of the University’s programs among the best in the nation, including its education program (second in New Jersey and 103 in the nation), its Master’s in Public Health program (second in New Jersey and 135 in the country) and its Master’s in Business Administration program (fourth in New Jersey and 185 in the nation). Montclair State University’s online Master of Arts in Educational Leadership program was ranked No. 1 in New Jersey and No. 25 in the nation in the U.S. News & World Report 2020 Best Online Programs rankings. The Feliciano School of Business was included in the 2020 edition of “The Best Business Schools” published by The Princeton Review. The MBA and Accounting programs of the Feliciano School of Business were both ranked in the top three out of 25 New Jersey institutions in the 2019 NJBIZ Reader Rankings. The Princeton Review Guide to Green Colleges: 2019 Edition included Montclair State in its rankings of America’s greenest campuses. Money magazine ranked Montclair State among the nation’s “Best Colleges for Your Money” in 2020. Money also ranked the University at No. 16 on its 2020 “Most Transformative Colleges” list. Campus Pride named Montclair State a “Premier Campus” in its 2020 Campus Pride Index, the national listing of LGBTQ-friendly colleges and universities. Montclair State earned the maximum five stars out of five, one of only two institutions in New Jersey to do so.

Athletics
Montclair State University's athletic teams have played under many names in the school's history. From the late 1920s to '30s, the school played as the "Big Red" and featured a large scarlet "M" on its uniforms. Next, Montclair State Teacher's College competed as the Indians, using a logo with a Native American chief's profile with the initials "MSTC" emblazoned on the caricature's headdress. The initials were changed to "MSC" when the school became Montclair State College in 1958. In response to the growing concerns voiced by Native Americans, the school changed its nickname to the Red Hawks, named after the Red-tailed Hawks that are indigenous to the area.

Division III sports
Montclair State University athletics are in the NCAA Division III in the New Jersey Athletic Conference (NJAC). The university currently offers the following sports:

Fall Sports
Women's Cross Country
Men's Football
Men's Soccer
Women's Soccer
Field Hockey
Women's Volleyball

Winter Sports
Men's Basketball
Women's Basketball
Men's Swimming and Diving
Women's Swimming and Diving
Men's Indoor Track and Field
Women's Indoor Track and Field

Spring Sports
Men's Baseball
Men's Lacrosse (Coastal Lacrosse Conference)
Women's Lacrosse
Women's Softball
Men's Outdoor Track and Field
Women's Outdoor Track and Field

Club sports
Men's Ice Hockey (ACHA Division II)
Men's Rugby (MetNY RFU Division II)
Men's Volleyball (Middle Atlantic Collegiate Volleyball Conference)
Baseball (National Club Baseball Association (NCBA) Division II Central)
Men's Lacrosse (National College Lacrosse League, NY Metro Conference, Division II)
Quidditch (Unofficial with the International Quidditch Association as of Spring 2015)

Sports fields and facilities
Sprague Field
The 6,000-seat field is home to the MSU football team, men's and women's lacrosse and field hockey teams.
Panzer Athletic Center Gymnasium
The 1,200-seat arena is home to the MSU men's and women's basketball teams and volleyball team.
Panzer Athletic Center Pool
The 500-seat Panzer Pool is home to the Red Hawk men's and women's swimming and diving teams.
MSU Soccer Park at Pittser Field
The 3,000-seat artificial turf field, which opened in 1998, is the main home for both the men's and women's soccer teams. Starting in 2017, Pittser Field will be the home of New York Red Bulls II.
Yogi Berra Stadium
The 3,400-seat stadium is home to the MSU baseball team and the Yogi Berra Museum. It was the former home of the New Jersey Jackals of the independent Frontier League from 1998-2022.
MSU Softball Stadium
The 300-seat stadium opened its doors in 2004 and is home to the MSU softball team, and also hosted the 2009 NCAA Division III Women's College World Series.
Montclair State University Ice Arena 
The ice skating arena, formerly known as Floyd Hall Arena, opened in March 1998 with two NHL size rinks, an off-ice training area, meeting rooms, concession stand, pro shop, and facilities for birthday parties. The arena now attracts over 500,000 visits per year and has become the home to many groups including The MSU Hockey Club, the Montclair Hockey Club, The North Jersey Figure Skating Club, the Clifton HS Mustangs and Nutley and Passaic Valley High School Hockey Teams. In 2020, the arena was acquired by the university and re-named Montclair State University Ice Arena.
Student Recreation Center
The 77,000-square-foot facility is home to two fitness floors, a six-lane swimming pool, two racquetball courts, a full-size basketball court with an overhead track, and two multi-purpose rooms. Montclair State University's Student Recreation Center hosts 13 intramural sports, a variety of fitness classes, and many special events throughout each year.

Campus

The original Montclair State University campus consisted of College Hall, Russ Hall, Chapin Hall and Morehead Hall, all built between 1908 and 1928. Housing for students returning from World War II was added near the end of the war. Between 1950 and 1980, Montclair State gradually acquired land from a former traprock quarry and expanded its facilities with an additional 23 buildings. Montclair State University began its next phase of growth in the late 1990s to accommodate New Jersey's growing student population. Dickson Hall was dedicated in 1995. The building is named for David W.D. Dickson, the first African American president of Montclair State University. The Floyd Hall Arena, an ice skating rink, was built in 1998. Science Hall, the home of the Department of Biology, opened in 1999. The Red Hawk Diner was built in 2001, making it the first diner on a university campus in the United States.

Other additions (2002–2011)
The Red Hawk Deck, MSU's first parking garage, opened in spring 2003
The Village Apartments at Little Falls, an apartment complex accommodating 850 students, opened in fall 2003.
The Women's Softball Stadium opened in 2004.
The 500-seat Alexander Kasser Theater opened in fall 2004.
The NJ Transit Montclair State University station and Parking Deck was opened October 20, 2004. It provide direct access to and from New York Penn Station, the city's main public transportation hub. This is also a major parking and transfer point on the Montclair-Boonton Line.
The Children's Center, Montclair State University's daycare facility for children of students and faculty, opened in fall 2005.
University Hall, the largest building on campus at the time and home of the College of Education and Human Services, opened in spring 2006.
The George Segal Gallery, located on the fourth floor of the Red Hawk Deck, opened in spring 2006.
Cafe Diem, a cafe attached to Sprague Library, opened in January 2007.
Chapin Hall, nearly 100 years old, was completely renovated and expanded to house the new John J. Cali School of Music.
A  Student Recreation Center opened in spring 2008.
Sinatra Hall, a new suite style residence hall near the Village, housing 300 undergraduate and graduate students, opened in August 2010.
CarParc Diem, the largest parking structure at MSU with approximately 1,600 spaces, opened in August 2010.
The Heights, two new housing complexes and a dining facility accommodating 2,000 students, opened August 2011.

Capital master plan (2013–2018)
MSU's most recent master plan contained $650 million in capital construction and improvements. The major projects under this new program were:

Two student housing and dining complexes, The Heights, are adjacent to the Student Recreation Center and CarParc Diem Garage. Opened in August 2011, they house approximately 2,000 students, increasing the on-campus housing capacity to 5,500, the second largest college residential population in New Jersey after Rutgers University in New Brunswick. They have also increased dining capacity at MSU by 25,000 gross square feet.
A  building to house the Feliciano School of Business, adjacent to University Hall. It opened in Fall 2015.
The  Center for Environmental and Life Sciences building, located adjacent to Richardson Hall, opened in 2015. CELS houses the Department of Earth and Environmental Studies and all of its research facilities, the Microscopy and Microanalysis Research Laboratory, the Margaret and Herman Sokol Institute for Pharmaceutical Life Sciences, the New Jersey Center for Water Science and Technology, the PSEG Institute for Sustainability Studies, and the interdisciplinary PhD program in Environmental Science and Management. The majority of the funding for this facility came from a bond issue passed by statewide referendum on November 6, 2012.
A  expansion of Morehead Hall, which connects the building with Life Hall and the DuMont TV center to form the Communication and Media Studies Center.
Various expansions, improvements and renovations of current residential buildings, athletic facilities, and academic facilities including College Hall, Partridge Hall, Mallory Hall (now the Center for Computing and Information Science), Life Hall, the Bond House, and Richardson Hall.

Peak Performances Controversy 
Dancer and choreographer Emily Johnson published a letter on January 20, 2021 addressed to the National Endowment for the Arts sharing the racist, extractive and harmful experience as a Yup’ik woman with Jedidiah Wheeler, Executive Director of Peak Performances.

Notable alumni

Science and technology
 Dr. Barbara Brummer, State Director of The Nature Conservancy in New Jersey since 2004. Prior to this she served in leadership roles in industry, including President of Johnson &Johnson Canada Inc., and Worldwide Vice President of the Women’s Health and Wellness Franchise. Dr. Brummer earned her BA in Biology at MSU in 1968.
William E. Gordon (1918–2010), physicist and astronomer, known as the "father of the Arecibo Observatory," director of the Arecibo Observatory and later Professor and Dean at Rice University. He earned B.A. and M. A. degrees from Montclair State College in 1939 and 1942 respectively.
 Paul J. Lioy (1947–2015), Professor, UMDNJ, Robert Wood Johnson Medical School
Dr. Anthony Scriffignano, Senior Vice President and Chief Data Scientist for Worldwide Data and Insight, Dun & Bradstreet. He earned a BS, cum laude, in Computer Science in 1982 and an MS in Computer Science in 1985.
 Herman Sokol (1916–1985), co-discoverer of tetracycline and president of Bristol-Myers Company graduated from Montclair State College

Politics and government
 Barbara Buono (born 1953), former New Jersey State Senator and former New Jersey Democratic Gubernatorial nominee
 Andrew R. Ciesla (born 1953), former member of the New Jersey Senate who represented the 10th Legislative District.
 Marion Crecco (1930-2015), member of the New Jersey General Assembly from 1986 to 2002
 Scott Garrett (born 1959), Congressman who represented New Jersey's 5th congressional district from 2003 to 2016.
 Sharpe James (born 1936), former Mayor of Newark
 Connie Myers (born 1944), politicians who served in the New Jersey General Assembly from 1996 to 2006, where she represented the 23rd Legislative District.
 Joan Voss (born 1940; B.A. 1962 / M.A. 1971), member of the Bergen County, New Jersey Board of Chosen Freeholders.

Business and industry
 Howie Hubler, Morgan Stanley bond trader whose positions on subprime-mortgage-related securities cost Morgan Stanley $9 billion in 2007.
 A. J. Khubani, founder, president and CEO of Telebrands Corp.

Arts and entertainment
 Jay Alders (class of 1996), fine artist, photographer and graphic designer, best known for his original surf art paintings.
 Tobin Bell (born 1942), actor, earned master's degree in environmental education

 Jason Biggs (born 1978), actor who briefly attended as an English major
 Edna Buchanan (born 1939), reporter and mystery writer.
 Kevin Carolan (born 1968, class of 1990), actor and comedian
 Lesley Choyce (born 1951), author of novels, non-fiction, children's books, and poetry
 Wendy Coakley-Thompson (born 1966, class of 1989), writer, studied broadcasting
 Paula Danziger (1944-2004), children's author who wrote more than 30 books, including her 1974 debut young adult novel, The Cat Ate My Gymsuit.
 Joshua Dela Cruz (born c. 1989, class of 2011), actor chosen in 2018 to be the host of Blue's Clue & You, a reboot of the Nickelodeon series Blue's Clues.
 Warren Farrell (born 1943, class of 1965), author
 Fernando Fiore (born 1960), television personality, sportscaster, actor, two-time Emmy award winner
 Michele Fitzgerald (born 1990), television personality, winner, Survivor: Kaôh Rōng
 Allen Ginsberg (1926-1997), poet; icon of the Beat Generation, briefly attended before transferring to Columbia University

 Camille Grammer (born 1968), reality television personality
 Terri L. Jewell (1954-1995) author, poet and Black lesbian activist.
 Brian Jude (born 1971, class of 1995), film director, writer, producer and actor
 Jayna Ledford, transgender ballet dancer
 Gaspard Louis, dancer and choreographer
 Olivia Lux (born 1994) Drag Queen, performed on season 13 of Rupaul's Drag Race. Graduated as a theater major class of 2016.
 Tom Malloy (born 1974, class of 1997), film actor, writer and producer
 Robert Marks – vocal coach, music arranger, accompanist, author, and music director
 Rob McClure (born 1982), actor
 Melba Moore (born 1945), singer
 Christine Nagy, radio personality, studied broadcasting
 Reggie Noble (born 1970, a.k.a. Redman), rapper who was expelled as a freshman.
 J. J. North (born 1964), actress
 Chris Opperman (born 1978), composer.
 Michael Price (class of 1981), television writer–producer
 Robert M. Price (born 1954, class of 1976), Biblical Scholar known as The Bible Geek and The Human Bible, H. P. Lovecraft Scholar
 Dania Ramirez (born 1979), film and television actress
 George Rochberg (1918–2005), composer (English major)
 Lorene Scafaria (born 1978), screenwriter and playwright who directed the film Hustlers.
 Thank You Scientist, progressive rock band formed at Montclair State in 2009
 Ray Toro (born 1977), lead guitarist of My Chemical Romance
 Justina Valentine (born 1987), rapper, MTV Personality
 Jessica Vosk (born 1983), singer/actress, who has appeared as Elphaba on the national tour of the hit musical Wicked.
 Mikey Way (born 1980), bassist of My Chemical Romance (dropped out)
 Steve Way (born 1990), actor, comedian, and disability rights advocate
 Dave White (born 1979), Derringer Award-winning mystery author
 Bruce Willis (born 1955), actor; attended as a theatre major

Frank "The Tank" Fleming, Mets Fan, Hot dog reviewer

Sports
 Kim Barnes Arico (born 1970), current head women's basketball coach at the University of MichiganWomen's Basketball Halls of Fame; former General Manager and President of the New York Liberty
 Yogi Berra (1925-2015), Hall of Fame baseball player, catcher for the New York Yankees

 Carol Blazejowski (born 1956), basketball player and member of the Naismith Memorial Basketball Hall of Fame
Anthony Bowens (born 1990), an American professional wrestler, currently signed to All Elite Wrestling
 Marco Capozzoli (born 1988), Arena Football player
 Mark Casale (born 1962), football player
 Kevin Cooney (born 1950), college baseball coach at Montclair State and Florida Atlantic
 Amod Field (born 1967), football player
 Mike Fratello (born 1947), NBA head coach, sports commentator
 Keith Glauber, Major League Baseball player
 Larry Hazzard (born 1944), Boxing referee, member of the International Boxing Hall of Fame (graduated with a bachelor of arts degree, 1972)
 Fred Hill (born 1959), Rutgers University basketball coach
 Sam Mills (1959-2005), NFL linebacker, coach, member of College Football Hall of Fame and Pro Football Hall of Fame

Others

 Dorothy Beecher Baker (1898-1954) Hand of the Cause of the Baháʼí Faith
 Olga Grau (born 1945), Chilean writer, professor, philosopher
 Eugene T. Maleska (1916-1993, class of 1937), crossword editor at The New York Times
 Nelson J. Perez (born 1961), prelate of the Roman Catholic Church who serves as the 10th archbishop of the Archdiocese of Philadelphia.
 Ma Anand Sheela (born 1949), chief assistant for the Indian guru Rajneesh who in 1985 pleaded guilty to attempted murder and assault for her role in the 1984 Rajneeshee bioterror attack.
 Carmela Soprano (born 1960), wife of mafia boss, Tony Soprano. Graduated with a B.A. in Business Administration.

Notable faculty
 Brenda Miller Cooper (1916-2008), operatic soprano

References

External links

 Official website

 
Little Falls, New Jersey
Montclair, New Jersey
Educational institutions established in 1908
Upper Montclair, New Jersey
Universities and colleges in Essex County, New Jersey
Universities and colleges in Passaic County, New Jersey
1908 establishments in New Jersey
Public universities and colleges in New Jersey